Dean Maimoni (born May 4, 1990), is an Israeli footballer who plays as a center defender for Hapoel Iksal.

Honours

Club
Hapoel Kiryat Shmona
Israel Super Cup: 2015

External links

1989 births
Living people
Israeli footballers
Hapoel Ironi Kiryat Shmona F.C. players
Bnei Sakhnin F.C. players
Maccabi Ahi Nazareth F.C. players
Hapoel Acre F.C. players
Maccabi Netanya F.C. players
Hapoel Ra'anana A.F.C. players
Hapoel Ramat Gan F.C. players
Hapoel Umm al-Fahm F.C. players
Hapoel Iksal F.C. players
Footballers from Northern District (Israel)
Israeli Premier League players
Liga Leumit players
Association football defenders